Garrha brachytricha is a moth in the family Oecophoridae. It was described by Turner in 1927. It is found in Australia, where it has been recorded from Tasmania.

The forewings are ochreous-pink, inclining to pale brick-red.

References

Moths described in 1927
Garrha